Fiona Ross may refer to:
 Fiona Ross (journalist)
 Fiona Ross (nurse)
 Fiona Ross (type designer)